Inclusive capitalism is a theoretical concept and policy movement that seeks to address the growing income and wealth inequality within Western capitalism following the financial crisis of 2007–2008 to improve business and society.

Semantic interpretation 
Inclusive capitalism is a term composed of two complementary meanings. The first one is that poverty is a significant, systemic problem in countries which have already embraced or are transitioning towards capitalistic economies. The second one is that companies and non-governmental organizations can sell goods and services to low-income people, which may lead to targeted poverty alleviation strategies, including improving people's nutrition, health care, education, employment and environment, but not their political power.

Philosophical origin 
Inclusive capitalism originates with philosophical questions that predate modern day capitalism. These questions regard people's motivation. Are people motivated by what is best for their own self-interest, for the good of society or perhaps somewhere in between? Different philosophers have advanced their own ideas about these questions, including Thomas Hobbes. Hobbes thought "[m]an was motivated by his appetites, desires, fear and self-interest, seeking pleasure and avoiding pain. [...] His main desire, and the most important of natural laws, was self-preservation and the avoidance of death". Hobbes’ assertion would become the foundation for capitalism, which espouses an exclusive rather than inclusive nature of people.

Hobbes' ideas influenced Adam Smith who thought governments should not repress people's self-interest in the economy, but "Smith never suggests that they [people] are motivated only by self-interest; he simply states that self-interest motivates more powerfully and consistently than kindness, altruism, or martyrdom". In the 17th and 18th centuries notions of morality (theology) and value (economics) separate, leading Smith to advance a new theory of value based on divisions of labor rather than value being defined in a religious context of working for God. For Smith "value cannot be measured by money, because sometimes money is artificially scarce [...] because all labor is of equal value to the worker, labor is the best measure of value". Thus the concept of capitalism is rooted in an idea of human nature being inherently self-interested and the value of goods and services are derived from labor.

Karl Marx critiqued capitalism by analyzing the division of labor in Europe from an historical perspective. He argued that people's human nature, more specifically their ideas "were largely a product of class, economic structures and social positions. Ideas justified or rationalized the economic structure at any one time – they did not cause that structure". Marx concluded that the division of labor contributes to perpetual inequality between the masses of low-income workers (proletariat) whose numbers are far greater and wealth far less than the minority and more powerful upper class (bourgeoisie) who are often politicians and business owners. Marx's historical perspective focused on the role of politics in contributing towards and legitimizing modes of production that created separate socioeconomic classes.

According to Marx, "[t]he division of labour inside a nation leads at first to the separation of industrial and commercial from agricultural labor, and hence to the separation of town and country and to conflict of their interests". The term town in this sense can be understood as the centers of political power and economic decision-making and the people who live in towns possess comparatively more power than those working in the countryside. According to Marx, those with the most power are included in the benefits of capitalism and those with less power are excluded from such benefits.

Karl Polanyi used a more cross-cultural approach to understanding different types of economies, including those based on capitalism. He began by describing the term "economic" as a combination of two separate meanings. The first is a "substantive meaning" that refers to the relationship humans have with one another and to the earth. The second is a "formal meaning" that deals with a "means-ends relationship" which focuses on economizing one's means to maximize one's ends (a "logical" and mechanistic understanding of what it means to be a human and participate in an economy). Polanyi charts how reciprocity, redistribution and exchange have been conducted in different cultures across time. Polanyi concluded that in some cultures economic transactions involve deep human relationships and rely on decision-making for environmental preservation and social cohesion. In others cultures, economies serve more of a function or utility of increasing capital where transactions are based less on the aim of social cohesion and environmental well being. The contemporary use of the term “inclusive capitalism” arises from the historical understanding of the essence of human nature and its role in economic decision-making.

Contemporary understanding 
Robert Ashford argues that the concept of inclusive capitalism is rooted in the postulates of the binary economics.

It is inconclusive who coined the term inclusive capitalism. Using different electronic databases to query this term, e.g. JSTOR, OCLC Academic, Web of Science, Google Scholar, etc., a Google Book search identified one of the oldest occurrences of the term appears in a 1943 Urban Land Institute publication, Urban Land (1943). Two scholars popularized the term individually and through collaborative publications, C. K. Prahalad, the Paul and Ruth McCracken Distinguished University Professor of Strategy of the Ross School of Business at the University of Michigan—Ross, and Allen Hammond, a vice president of Special Projects and Innovation at the World Resources Institute.

Prahalad opens his 2005 book The Fortune at the Bottom of the Pyramid: Eradicating Poverty Through Profits by asking “Why can’t we create inclusive capitalism”. He uses the term “inclusive capitalism” to invite readers to focus on underserved consumers and markets in order to create opportunity for all.

Among Hammond's earliest publications that discusses the exclusiveness of capitalism is a 2001 article titled Digitally Empowered Development published in the journal Foreign Affairs. In the article, Hammond describes how technology in the 1990s has led many people to experience greater wealth and allowed for their overall quality of life to improve. He also notes that billions of people continue to live in poverty in countries developing their capitalistic society. In order to address this exclusiveness of capitalism a new capitalistic model should be used, argues Hammond. “What is needed instead is a bottom-up model that makes credit, communications, information, energy sources, and other self-help tools […] The idea behind this new development model is that basic services should generally be provided by businesses -- sometimes directly, sometimes in partnership with governments or networks of non-governmental organizations (NGOs)”.

Prahalad and Hammond co-published a 2002 article in the Harvard Business Review that advanced their ideas of using market-based solutions for poverty alleviation through a hypothetical case study of development in India. In 2004, they advanced their ideas in another co-authored publication, this time highlighting three misconceptions of poor people commonly held by companies. The first is that poor people have little buying power. The second is that low-income people do not like change when in fact they often receive little opportunity to choose among a variety of products and services. The third is little money can be made by selling to the poor. The “world's poor-families with an annual household income of less than $6,000-is enormous. The 18 largest emerging and transition countries include 680 million such households, with a total annual income of $1.7 trillion-roughly equal to Germany's annual gross domestic product”.

Implementation 
In 2012, the Henry Jackson Society created a task force for Inclusive Capitalism Initiative project in order to start a transatlantic conversation about the growing income inequalities and their threat to the capitalist system.

In 2014, Conference on Inclusive Capitalism, co-hosted by the City of London and E. L. Rothschild holding company, was held in London where the concept of inclusive capitalism was discussed as a practical measure. At another conference in 2015 the "Pathway to Action" was brainstormed. In the same 2015 year, the Coalition for Inclusive Capitalism was registered in the United States as a not-for-profit organization. Lynn Forester de Rothschild became the founding CEO of the Coalition. At the 2016 Conference on Inclusive Capitalism in New York City, participants expressed commitment to promote inclusive economic growth. Members of the Coalition expressed a belief that all stakeholders, including business and society, should be engaged in the enactment of an inclusive capitalism agenda

In 2019, the Embankment Project for Inclusive Capitalism (EPIC) undertaken by the Coalition together with Ernst & Young reported its findings in a white paper. It was a pioneering effort to "develop a framework and identify meaningful metrics to report on long-term and inclusive value creation activities that heretofore have not been captured on traditional financial statements".

In 2020, the Council for Inclusive Capitalism, a partnership of the Coalition with the Vatican, was created.

Some pundits express optimism that it is possible to remake capitalism in a more inclusive and responsible way.

Criticism 
A critique of the ideas behind inclusive capitalism begins where Hammond and Prahalad end. Inclusive capitalism as used by Hammond and Prahalad divorces political power from economic empowerment. It is not concerned with improving poor people's political condition, allowing those in poverty to have greater political control and representation in government. It does not endorse macroeconomic changes through government policies that ensure higher wages, equitable access to housing, education, nutrition and health care across socioeconomic classes, particularly for poor people. Inclusive capitalism maintains political accountability in contributing to poverty is limited to not doing enough to encourage private enterprise (1) to create more jobs for low-income people; (2) to allow poor people access to financial capital for entrepreneurialism, (3) to enable poor people the opportunity to purchase a variety of goods and services. No consideration is given to governments and companies that benefit from having low-income and poorly educated populations who provide necessary labor.

In 2007, Hammond and a team of researchers from the Inter-American Development Bank, the World Bank Group’s International Finance Corporation and the World Resource Institute concluded that poverty afflicts four billion people worldwide, many of whom are living in capitalistic countries or countries transitioning towards capitalism (Hammond et al. 2007). Poverty is defined as “those with incomes below $3,000 in local purchasing power” (Hammond et al. 2007:3). Based on this evidence, the lived experiences of most human beings is that they are living in countries practicing different degrees of capitalism, which has proven itself to be highly exclusive. The opening pages of the 2007 report by Hammond et al. reveal additional funding for the report came from Intel, Microsoft, Royal Dutch Shell and Visa International. This may suggest that crony capitalism and inclusive capitalism may have overlapping interests.

An alternative understanding of capitalism and how to make it more inclusive is offered by anthropologists, historians, medical and social workers, and sociologists. These and other scientists use ethnography, economic data and political history to document intentional public policies supported by business interests to maintain the status quo of low-income populations. Governments and businesses collude to prevent low-income populations with access to affordable housing, health care, education and nutrition because they divert resources to maximizing profits from middle- and upper-income populations. Making capitalism more inclusive certainly includes Hammond's and Prahalad's suggestions of encouraging companies to sell goods to poor people at affordable prices. However, inclusive capitalism must address political considerations that maintain structural inequalities within any economy.

Hammond and Prahalad champion information and communication technologies (ICTs), such as cell phones, computers and the Internet as powerful tools for poverty alleviation. Ethnographic data from anthropologists and sociologists reveal widely available and affordable ICTs provide qualitative improvement in the lives of low-income people, but don't measurably improve their livelihood and wealth. The research indicates that measurable improvement in poor people's lives is not likely to occur without comprehensive government policies that simultaneously encourage living wages, affordable housing, access to nutritious and low-cost food, high quality and inexpensive schooling, health care and public transportation. While these public policies may be delivered by businesses and NGOs, government oversight does not need to be removed for a more inclusive capitalist economy.

John Kay claims that most of the 21st-century businesses are already inclusive.

Nafeez Ahmed describes the Inclusive Capitalism Initiative as a Trojan Horse assembled to pacify the coming global revolt against capitalism.

See also 
 Progressive capitalism
 Community capitalism
 Neo-Capitalism
 Binary economics
 Humanistic capitalism
 Inclusive growth
 Creating shared value
 Corporate social responsibility

References

Further reading 
 Farmer, Paul (2003). Pathologies of Power: Health, Human Rights, and the New War on the Poor. Berkeley, CA: University of California Press.
 Goode, Judith, and Jeff Maskovsky (2001). The New Poverty Studies: The Ethnography of Power, Politics, and Impoverished People in the United States. New York: New York University Press.
 Hammond, Allen L. and C. K. Prahalad (2004). Selling to the Poor, Foreign Policy, 142:30-37.
 Hammond, Allen L., William J. Kramer, Robert S. Katz, Julia T. Tran, Courtland Walker (2007). The Next 4 Billion: Market Size and Business Strategy at the Base of the Pyramid . Accessed April 25, 2008.
 O'Connor, Alice (2001). Poverty Knowledge: Social Science, Social Policy, and the Poor in Twentieth-Century U.S. History. Princeton, NJ: Princeton University Press.
 Prahalad, C. K. and, Allen Hammond (2002). Serving the world's poor, profitably, Harvard Business Review, 80(9):48-58.
 Yelvington, Kevin A. (1995). Producing Power: Ethnicity, Gender, and Class in a Caribbean Workplace. Philadelphia: Temple University Press.

External links 
 Coalition for Inclusive Capitalism
 Coalition for Inclusive Capitalism—Press
 Inclusive Capitalism for the American Workforce: Reaping the Rewards of Economic Growth through Broad-based Employee Ownership and Profit Sharing, Center for American Progress, 2011
 The State and Direction of Inclusive Capitalism, Saïd Business School, Oxford University—Deloitte Consulting, LLP
 David G. Green. Inclusive Capitalism: How we can make independence work for everyone, Civitas: Institute for the Study of Civil Society, 2017

Capitalist systems
Economic ideologies
Economic liberalism
Production economics
Social philosophy
Western culture